Heterostegane minax is a moth of the family Geometridae. It is found in West China.

References

Abraxini
Moths described in 1931